Réjean or Rejean is a French masculine given name. Notable people with this name include:
Réjean Cloutier (born 1960), former professional hockey player
Réjean Cournoyer (born 1971), Canadian actor and singer
Réjean Ducharme (1941–2017), Quebec novelist and playwright
Réjean Génois (born 1952), former professional and Davis Cup tennis player from Quebec City
Réjean Houle (born 1949), retired Canadian ice hockey forward
Réjean Lefebvre (born 1943), member of the Canadian House of Commons from 1993 to 2000
Réjean Lemelin (born 1954), former National Hockey League goaltender
Réjean Savoie (born 1952), businessman and former political figure in New Brunswick
Rejean Stringer (born 1974), retired Canadian ice hockey forward

Masculine given names
French masculine given names